Perdita interrupta is a species of bee in the family Andrenidae. It is found in North America.

Subspecies
These three subspecies belong to the species Perdita interrupta:
 Perdita interrupta interrupta
 Perdita interrupta kernensis Timberlake, 1956
 Perdita interrupta vernalis Timberlake, 1956

References

Further reading

 
 

Andrenidae
Articles created by Qbugbot
Insects described in 1878